The Konini railway station on the Wairarapa Line was located in the Tararua District of the Manawatū-Whanganui region in New Zealand’s North Island.

The station opened on 5 January 1897 and closed on 9 June 1969.

References  

Buildings and structures in Manawatū-Whanganui
Rail transport in Manawatū-Whanganui
Tararua District
Defunct railway stations in New Zealand
Railway stations opened in 1897
Railway stations closed in 1969
1897 establishments in New Zealand
1969 disestablishments in New Zealand